Mbekweni is a township situated between Wellington and Paarl in the Western Cape province of South Africa. As of 2011 it had a population of 30,875 residents in 8,339 households. Paarl, Mbekweni and Wellington form a continuous urban area within the Drakenstein Municipality.

References

Populated places in the Drakenstein Local Municipality
Townships in the Western Cape